WRTC can refer to:

 WRTC-FM, a radio station located in Hartford, Connecticut
 Walter Rand Transportation Center, a transit hub in Camden, New Jersey
 Waterford Regional Technical College, a college in Waterford, Ireland
 World Radiosport Team Championship
 School of Writing, Rhetoric and Technical Communication, a department at James Madison University
 Wind River Tribal College, a college in Fort Washakie, Wyoming
 Washington Regional Transplant Community, referenced in A Life Everlasting by Sarah Gray